The Wiehl is a 33.6-kilometre-long, orographically left tributary of the River Agger in the German state of North Rhine-Westphalia. It is the longest river situated entirely within the county of Oberbergischer Kreis and the third longest tributary of the Agger.

Geography 
The river rises in the region of Bergisches Land in the municipality of Reichshof. The Wiehl initially flows in a southerly direction and passes through the parish of Wiehl. Near Wildbergerhütte it turns towards the west. Between Nespen and Brüchermühle it is impounded by the Wiehl Dam. After passing Brüchermühle it is impounded again, this time by the Stauweiher Bieberstein. From here it flows mainly in a northwesterly direction.

Tributaries 
The following is a list of Wiehl tributaries with their orographic orientation (left/right), location of their mouth and elevation at the mouth.

 Aubach (left) near Wildbergerhütte at 
 Hamerter Bach (right) near Hamert at 
 Dreschhauser Bach (right) after Nespen into the Wiehl Reservoir at 
 Streesharthbach (left) into a forebay of the Wiehl Reservoir at 
 Asbach (left) near Brüchermühle at 
 Heisterbach (right) before Oberwiehl at 
 Dreisbach (right) near Oberwiehl at 
 Oberholzener Bach (right) before Wiehl at 
 Mottelbach (left) near Wiehl at 
 Alpebach (right) after Wiehl at 
 Ülpebach (left) near Bielstein at 
 Molbach (left) before Wielmünden at

Flooding 
On 3 May 2001, following torrential rain, what were described as hundred-year floods washed aways parts of some roads. Between 4 and 8 pm, 110 litres of rain fell per square metre. The average monthly precipitation in North Rhine-Westphalia is only 100 litres.

See also
List of rivers of North Rhine-Westphalia

References 

Rivers of North Rhine-Westphalia
Rivers of Germany